Home and Away is an album by Del Shannon. It was recorded in England in 1967, but the singles did not achieve chart success and the album was not released. It was released (with a few other later songs added) in a remixed version 1978 under the title And The Music Plays On, then released under its original name, with the original intended cover, and original track list (except for added bonus tracks) in 2006.

Track listing
"It's My Feeling" (Andrew Rose, David Skinner)
"Mind Over Matter" (Jeremy Paul Solomons)
"Silently" (Dan Bourgoise, Del Shannon)
"Cut and Come Again" (Billy Nicholls)
"My Love Has Gone" (Ross Watson)
"Led Along" (Billy Nicholls)
"Life Is But Nothing" (Andrew Rose, David Skinner)
"Easy to Say" (Andrew Rose, David Skinner)
"Friendly with You" (Billy Nicholls)
"He Cheated" (Del Shannon)
"Runaway '67" (Del Shannon, Max Crook). With John Paul Jones, Nicky Hopkins and Jimmy Page as session musicians.

CD bonus tracks

"Led Along" [Mono, US & UK Single] (Billy Nicholls)
"Mind Over Matter" [Mono, UK Single] (Jeremy Paul Solomons)
"Runaway '67" [Mono, US & UK Single] (Del Shannon, Max Crook)
"He Cheated" [Mono, US Single] (Del Shannon)
"Silently" [Mono, Philippines Single] (Dan Bourgoise, Del Shannon)

References

1967 albums
2006 albums
Del Shannon albums
Albums published posthumously
Albums produced by Andrew Loog Oldham
EMI Records albums
Immediate Records albums
albums recorded at Olympic Sound Studios